The 2017 Ettrick, Roxburgh and Berwickshire by-election was a by-election held on 8 June 2017 for the Scottish Parliament constituency of Ettrick, Roxburgh and Berwickshire. It was triggered by the resignation of John Lamont.

Background
Conservative politician John Lamont was elected as MSP for the constituency at the 2016 election, having first been elected in 2007. Lamont announced on 25 April 2017 that he would be standing in the 2017 UK general election and submitted his resignation as MSP for Ettrick, Roxburgh and Berwickshire with effect from 4 May, which triggered a by-election. Ken Macintosh, the Presiding Officer scheduled the by-election for 8 June, the same date as the UK general election.

Four candidates were nominated: Conservative Rachael Hamilton, Gail Hendry for the Scottish National Party, Sally Prentice for Labour and Catriona Bhatia for the Liberal Democrats. Hamilton, who had been a regional MSP for South Scotland, resigned her seat in advance of the by-election.

Result

2016 result

References 

Ettrick, Roxburgh and Berwickshire 2017
Ettrick, Roxburgh and Berwickshire by-election
2010s elections in Scotland
Ettrick, Roxburgh and Berwickshire by-election
Politics of the Scottish Borders
Ettrick, Roxburgh and Berwickshire by-election